Irish Hearts may refer to:
 Irish Hearts (1934 film), a British drama film
 Irish Hearts (1927 film), an American comedy film